Iolaus likpe, the Likpe sapphire, is a butterfly in the family Lycaenidae. It is found in Ghana.

References

Butterflies described in 2003
Iolaus (butterfly)
Endemic fauna of Ghana
Butterflies of Africa